Liath: WorldSpiral (Russian: Лиат: Спираль мира) is a 1998 Russian adventure video game developed by Amber Company and Exortus, and published by Project Two Interactive for Windows.

Production 
The surrealist design of the game took around two years to develop. Oleg Kozhukhov served as the game's director and producer.

Plot and gameplay 
The player is a magician named Criss who is looking for a friend named Tiche, who disappeared many years ago in a place called Azeretus. 

Gameplay involves talking to characters, solving puzzles, and exploring the environment.

Critical reception 
Adventure Gamers was not impressed with the English translation of the game. Just Adventure gave high praise to the title's visual aesthetic. NQuest felt the game didn't have a very distinct plot. Game Over felt the game promised too much and undelivered. Quandaryland thought the game had charm despite its many flaws.

References

External links 
 Official website
 PC Joker review

1998 video games
Video games developed in Russia
Adventure games
Windows games
Windows-only games